The following Union Army units and commanders fought in the Camden Expedition of the American Civil War. Order of battle compiled from the army organization during the campaign. The Confederate order of battle is listed separately.

Abbreviations used

Military rank
 MG = Major General
 BG = Brigadier General
 Col = Colonel
 Ltc = Lieutenant Colonel
 Maj = Major
 Cpt = Captain
 Lt = 1st Lieutenant

Union forces

VII Corps (Department of Arkansas)
MG Frederick Steele444 officers, 11,162 men, 30 guns (not including Clayton's command)
Escort (2 officers, 88 men): 
 3rd Illinois Cavalry, Company D: Lt Solomon M. Tabor
 15th Illinois Cavalry, Company H: Cpt Thomas J. Beebe

See also

 Army of Arkansas
 Arkansas in the American Civil War

Notes

References
 Forsyth, Michael J.  The Camden Expedition of 1864 and the Opportunity Lost by the Confederacy to Change the Civil War (Jefferson, NC:  McFarland & Company, Inc., Publishers), 2003. .
 U.S. War Department, The War of the Rebellion: a Compilation of the Official Records of the Union and Confederate Armies. Series 1, Vol. XXXIV, Part 1, Washington, DC: U.S. Government Printing Office, 1880–1901.

American Civil War orders of battle